Box Cricket League (BCL) is an Indian sports reality television show where celebrities are seen competing with each other in an indoor cricket game format.

Establishment
The BCL was inspired by the popularity of the Celebrity Cricket League, a T10 tournament with franchises in major Indian cities. The series is a unique collaboration of sports, celebrities and entertainment conceptualized by Marinating Films. The inaugural season had 8 teams competing against each other. For the second season two additional teams were added.

History

First season 
The inaugural season took place in 2014, which was contested by 8 teams – Chandigarh Cubs, Delhi Dragons, Rowdy Bangalore, Mumbai Tigers, Kolkata Baabu Moshayes, Jaipur Raj Joshiley, Pune Anmol Ratn and Ahmedabad Express. Delhi Dragons emerged as the inaugural BCL champions. The first season aired on Sony Entertainment Television India.

Second season
The second season took place in 2016. Two new cricket teams, Chennai Swaggers and Lucknow Nawabs were added to the BCL. Again in Season 2, Delhi Dragons for the second time in a row and emerged as the 2 times champions of BCL. The second season aired on Colors TV.

Third season
The third season premiered on 25 February 2018. Lucknow Nawabs defeated the two-time champions Delhi Dragons and emerged as the winners of Season 3. The third aired on MTV India. RJ Sidhu was the commentator for BCL 3.

Fourth season
The fourth season premiered on 29 April 2019. The fourth season continued aired on MTV India. RJ Sidhu was the commentator for BCL 4.

Series details

Teams
The show consists of teams competing for grand prize.

Teams' performances

Team Members: Season 1
Chandigarh Cubs

 Shiv Panditt (Owner)
 Anita Hassanandani (Owner)
 Barkha Sengupta (Captain)
 Indraneil Sengupta
 Additi Gupta
 Rannvijay Singha
 Amit Varma
 Bani J
 Hasan Zaidi
 Chetna Pande
 Gavie Chahal
 Vishal Karwal
 Varun Sharma
 Vrushika Mehta
 Raghu Ram
 Rajiv Laxman
 Shantanu Maheshwari
 Sachin Kumar
 Waseem Mushtaq
 Ankit Patidar
 Uday Tiwari
 Imam A Siddique (Supporter)
 Ruhanika Dhawan (Supporter)

Rowdy Bangalore

 Sara Khan (captain & owner)
 Ravi Kishan
 Vindu Dara Singh
 Paras Chhabra
 Ajaz Khan
 Abhinav Kapoor
 Sailesh Gulabani
 Ashita Dhawan
 Puru Chibber
 Manish Raisinghan
 Chestha Bhagat
 Abigail Pande 
 Srikant Maski
 Nauman Sait
 Aslam Khan
 Prateik Babbar
 Sukirti Kandpal
 Nalini Negi
 Parth Mehrotra
 Mayank Sharma
 Loveleen Kaur Sasan
 Sonali Nikam
 Dheeraj Dhoopar
 Ashmit Patel
 Rakhi Sawant
 Ankit Narang
 Param Singh

Kolkata Baabu Moshayes

 Divyanka Tripathi
 Hiten Tejwani
 Meghna Naidu
 Karan Kundra
 Karan Mehra
 Naman Shaw
 Raj Singh Arora
 Sayantani Ghosh
 Abhinav Shukla
 Anuj Sachdeva
 Alok Narula
 Amit Sareen
 Avinash Sachdev
 Dimple Jhangiani
 Salil Acharya
 Sharad Malhotra
 Sudeepa Singh
 Sumeet Sachdev
 Abhishek Rawat
 Nivedita Basu
 Vindhya Tiwari

Pune Anmol Ratn

 Prachi Mishra
 Shaleen Malhotra
 Sahil Anand
 Behzaad Khan
 Sumit Suri
 Maqbool Khan
 Rishika Mihani
 Krrishna Soni
 Mayank Gandhi
 Vrinda Dawda
 Vineet Kumar
 Rafi Malik
 Rahul Roy
 Shravan Reddy
 Kunicka Lal
 Khushwant Walia
 Mansi Sharma
 Shabir Ahluwalia

Delhi Dragons

 Suyyash Rai (captain)
 Rithvik Dhanjani
 Nia Sharma
 Deepika Singh
 Anas Rashid
 Asha Negi
 Rubina Dilaik
 Karan Grover
 Surbhi Jyoti
 Karan Wahi
 Vishal Singh
 Giaa Manek
 Kishwer Merchant
 Aadesh Chaudhary
 Ashish Sharma
 Bharat Chawda
 Sehban Azim
 Vishal Kotian
 Priya Wal
 Maninder Singh
 Ranjan Chhabbra
 Abhijeet Sawant
 Ekta Kaul

Mumbai Warriors

 Karan Tacker (captain)
 Krystle D'Souza
 Drashti Dhami
 Ashish Kapoor
 Digangana Suryavanshi
 Shalin Bhanot
 Dalljiet Kaur
 Rucha Hasabnis
 Gaurav Khanna
 Muskaan Nancy James
 Sana Khan
 Navina Bole
 Puneet Sachdeva
 Aryan Panditt
 Karan Jotwani
 Neeraj Malviya
 Micckie Dudaaney
 Rohit Pareek
 Vipul Gupta
 Kunal Pant
 Adhvik Mahajan
 Mohit Dagga
 Anupam Bhattacharya
 Naveen Saini
 Harshita Gaur
 Sangita Kapure
 Shritama Mukherjee
 Mihir Mishra
 Mrunal Thakur
 Arjit Taneja

Jaipur Raj Joshiley

 Kamya Punjabi (captain)
 Karan Patel
 Rajiv Thakur
 Balraj Syal
 Puneet Panjwani
 Sangram Singh
 Vikramjeet Virk
 Jimmy Sharma
 Ankit Modgil
 Aly Goni
 Sandit Tiwari
 Srishty Rode
 Ankita Sharma
 Sohana Sinha
 Mihika Verma
 Shweta Dhadich
 Manish Naggdev
 Sneha Wagh
 Sumeet Raghavan
 Shivin Narang
 Anurag Sharma
 Gaurav Sharma
 Pankaj Bhatia
 Natasa Stankovic

Ahmedabad Express

 Nandish Sandhu (captain)
 Rashami Desai
 Tina Datta
 Pooja Gor
 Madhura Naik
 Ajay Chaudhary
 Mrunal Jain (owner)
 Manav Gohil
 Mohit Malik
 Adaa Khan
 Mohammad Nazim
 Arjun Bijlani
 Elli Avram
 Shashank Vyas
 Jasveer Kaur
 Anirudh Dave
 Disha Parmar
 Firoza Khan
 Chaitanya Choudhury
 Aastha
 Arti Singh
 Saurabh Raj Jain
 Shobhit Attray
 Vikas Sethi
 Himanshu Malhotra
 Swarupraj Medara
 Ishtyaq Syed
 Sudeep Sahir
 Rajeev Pillai
 Kapil Nirmal

Team members: Season 2
Delhi Dragons

Karan Wahi (Captain)
Aadesh Chaudhary
Suyyash Rai
Kishwer Merchant
Surbhi Jyoti
Neha Marda
Karanveer Mehra
Firoza Khan
Shruti Ulfat
Ekta Kaul
Vrinda Dawda 
Ashish Sharma
Sehban Azim 
Bharat Chawda
Abhijeet Sawant
Salil Ankola
Maninder Singh
Vishal Kotian
Ranjan Chabra
Romanch Mehta
Aaryamann Seth
Mandana Karimi (supporter)
Keith Sequeira (supporter)
Rochelle Rao (supporter)
Nora Fatehi (supporter)
Gizele Thakral (supporter)
Rimi Sen (supporter)

Chandigarh Cubs

Anita Hassanandani (owner)
Shiv Panditt (owner)
Barkha Sengupta (captain)
Bharti Singh
Prince Narula
Karan Patel
Rannvijay Singh 
Vrushika Mehta
Shantanu Maheshwari
Additi Gupta
Indraneil Sengupta
Bani J
Sangram Singh
Raghu Ram
Rajiv Laxman
Alok Narula
Amit Varma
Waseem Mushtaq
Hasan Zaidi
Gavie Chahal
Sachin Kumar
Uday Tiwari
Vikram Bhatt
Ruhanika Dhawan
Rizwan Bachav

Rowdy Bangalore

Sara Khan (captain)
Ajaz Khan
Ankit Gera
Ratan Rajput
Loveleen Kaur Sasan
Sailesh Gulabani
Rajeev Paul
Ashita Dhawan
Ankita Sharma
Vikas Verma 
Puru Chibber
Srikant Maski
Mayank Sharma
Sana Khan
Mahek Chahal
Ali Quli Mirza

Kolkata Baabu Moshayes

Sharad Malhotra (Captain)
Shakti Arora
Asha Negi
Sayantani Ghosh 
Karanvir Bohra
Hiten Tejwani
Anuj Sachdeva
Naman Shaw
Krip Suri
Aparna Dixit 
Aly Goni
Gautam Gupta
Salil Acharya
Sumeet Sachdev
Vindhya Tiwari
Sudeepa Singh
Arjit Taneja
Yuvika Chaudhary
Meghna Naidu
Abhishek Rawat
Amit Sarin
Abhinav Shukla
Neha Saxena
Charu Mehra

Pune Anmol Ratn

Varun Badola (Captain)
Divyanka Tripathi
Rajeshwari Sachdev
Harshita Gaur
Param Singh
Ankur Nayyar
Roopal Tyagi
Neeraj Malviya
Gunjan Utreja
Puneet Sachdev
Tanya Abrol
Abhinav Kapoor
Pariva Pranati
Vineet Kumar
Kunickaa Sadanand 
Krrishna Soni
Priya Shinde
Vipul Gupta 
Raja Bherwani

Chennai Swaggers

Shabir Ahluwalia 
Shaheer Sheikh 
Himanshoo Malhotra
Rithvik Dhanjani 
Vishal Singh 
Rafi Malik 
Shobit Attrey
Mayank Gandhi
Shravan Reddy
Paaras Madaan
Abhishek Verma
Sharad Tripathi
Kunal Pant
Glen Saldana
Parichay Sharma
Mrunal Thakur
Vahbbiz Dorabjee
Mansi Sharma
Erica Fernandes
Pooja Banerjee
Riya Deepsi
Shraddha Jaiswal
Soni Singh
Shiny Doshi

Mumbai Tigers

Arjun Bijlani
Sanaya Irani
Mohit Sehgal
Dalljiet Kaur
Drashti Dhami
Ravi Dubey
Karishma Tanna
Upen Patel
Ridhi Dogra
Rajshri Rani
Mouni Roy
Radhika Madan
Shraddha Arya
Kavita Kaushik
Tia Bajpai
Digangana Suryavanshi
Rishika Mihani
Shritama Mukherjee
Sahil Anand
Gaurav Khanna
Ashish Kapoor
Jay Soni
Lavina Tandon
Shaleen Malhotra
Anupam Bhattacharya
Behzaad Khan 
Karan Jotwani
Muskaan Arora
Kunal Verma
Aditya Redij
Siddharthh Shivpuri 
Mickey Dudaaney
Aakash Ahuja 
Ali Merchant
Sangeeta Kapure
Smriti Khanna 
Kaizeen Irani

Jaipur Raj Joshiley

Rajiv Thakur (Captain)
Kamya Punjabi
Devoleena Bhattacharjee
Shivin Narang
Diandra Soares
Tejasswi Prakash
Helly Shah
Avinash Sachdev
Ragini Khanna
Nalini Negi
Paras Babbar
Pratap Hadda
Vishal Vashishtha
Manav Gohil
Anurag Sharma
Mugdha Chaphekar
Ravish Desai
Gagan Mallik
Lalit Bisht
Renee Dhyani
Priya Malik
Claudia Ciesla
Ankit Modgill
Tarun Khanna
Balraj Syal
Sana Saeed
Punit Panjwani

Ahmedabad Express

Mrunal Jain
Nandish Sandhu
Hard Kaur
Tina Datta
Mohammad Nazim
Toral Rasputra
Aishwarya Sakhuja
Siddharth Arora
Hina Khan
Paridhi Sharma
Deepika Singh
Siddhaanth Vir Surryavanshi
Aasiya Kazi
Akanksha Singh
Arti Singh
Jasvir Kaur
Neel Motwani
Vinod Singh
Rohit Nag
Gulshan Nain
Amit Dolawat
Ravjit Singh
Prerna Wanvari
Mayuresh Wadkar
Swaroop Raj Medara 
Sonali Raut
Sushant Divgikar
Preetika Rao

Lucknow Nawabs

Ajay Chaudhary
Rashami Desai
Tanya Sharma
Sargun Mehta
Manish Raisinghan
Avika Gor
Rohit Purohit
Himanshu Soni
Rati Pandey 
Vineet Raina
Vishal Aditya Singh
Neha Sargam 
Ankit Tiwari
Mayur Mehta
Meherzan Mazda
Sikandar Kharbanda
Anirudh Dave
Trishika Tiwari
Mohit Dagga
Garima Jain
Kanchi Singh
Priyamvada Kant 
Rishina Kandhari
Sheena Bajaj
Kapil Nirmal
Alekh Sangal
Shraman Jain
Falaq Naaz
Vandna Singh
Annie Gill
Malkhan Singh 
Mayank Kalra

Team members: Season 3
Lucknow Nawabs

Shruti Seth (captain)
Rohan Mehra
Kanchi Singh
Lopamudra Raut
Mohit Hiranandani 
Mayank Verma
Dipika Kakar
Shoaib Ibrahim
Falaq Naaz
Kratika Sengar
Ajay Chaudhary
Karam Rajpal
Tanya Abrol
Akshata Soonawalle
Savant Singh Prem
Meherzan Mazda
Shray Rai
Uday Tiwary
Zain Imam
Jasmin Bhasin
Puneet Suchdeva

Delhi Dragons

Aadesh Chaudhary (captain)
Aryamann Seth
Sahil Anand
Firoza Khan
Karan Wahi
Bani J
Additi Gupta
Rafi Malik
Neeraj Malviya
Vishal Kotian
Puru Chibber
Abhishek Kapur
Maninder Singh
Renee Dhyani
Romanch Mehta
Anmol Chaudhary
Pari Sahni
Meenal Shah

Ahmadabad Express

Nandish Sandhu
Mrunal Jain
Aakanksha Singh
Aasiya Kazi
Toral Rasputra
Kunal Pant
Lavina Tandon 
Annie Gill 
Lekha Purohit
Mohammad Nazim
Ravish Desai
Karan Khandelwal
Srikant Maski
Gulshan Nain
Devoleena Bhattacharjee
Sidharth Shukla
Sonali Raut

Kolkata Babu Moshayes

Hiten Tejwani (captain)
Arshi Khan
Vindhya Tiwari
Akash Dadlani
Nivideta Basu
Utkarsh Gupta
Sneha Gupta
Charu Asopa
Sara Khan
Sharad Malhotra
Karan Singh Chabra
Ashwini Kaul
Charu Mehra
Shabaaz Abdullah Badi
Anshul Pandey
Krip Suri
Amit Sarin
Naman Shaw
Abhishek Malik
Latika Gill 
Sumeet Sachdev
Kushagre Dua
Aparna Dixit

Chandigarh Cubs

 Barkha Sengupta (captain)
 Anita Hassanandani (owner)
 Shiv Panditt (owner)
 Karan Patel
 Aly Goni
 Aditi Bhatia
 Krishna Mukherjee
 Baseer Ali
 Varun Sood
 Kunwar Amar
 Samyuktha Hegde
 Gavie Chahal
 Indraneil Sengupta
 Waseem Mushtaq
 Sachin Kumar

Jaipur Raj Joshiley

 Rajeev Thakur
 Paras Babbar
 Gagan Mallik
 Kamya Panjabi
 Pratap Hada
 Puneet Panjwani
 Manveer Gurjar
 Divya Agarwal
 Muskaan Arora
 Shweta Mehta
 Lakshya Handa
 Roshni Sahota
 Abhay Singh
 Bhuvan Chopra
 Dakssh Ajit Singh

Chennai Swaggers

 Himmanshoo Malhotra
 Shabir Ahluwalia
 Shaheer Sheikh
 Shobhit Attray
 Vivek Dahiya
 Abhishek Verma
 Paras Arora
 Erica Fernandes
 Pooja Banerjee
 Mansi Sharma
 Kaizan Irani
 Ishani Sharma
 Madhurima Tuli
 Vishal Aditya Singh

Mumbai Tigers

 Arjun Bijlani
 Suyyash Rai
 Balraj Syal
 Shikha Singh
 Arti Singh
 Kishwer Merchant
 Manu Panjabi
 Purva Rana
 Chiraag Sethi
 Siddharth Bhardwaj
 Dalljiet Kaur
 Nibedita Paul
 Shiny Doshi

Team members: Season 4

BCL Season 1 Details
Host: Kavita Kaushik and VJ Andy
Commentators: Aparshakti and Ruchi

League table

  advanced to Semi-Finals

Play-Offs

Awards of the Series

BCL Season 2 Details
Host: Pritam Singh, Sumeet Vyas (Ep-1 to 18 & 21 to 24), Ajay Chaudhary (Ep-19) and Mohit Daga (Ep-20)
Commentators: Aparshakti, Shardul Pandit, RJ Urmin and RJ Sidhu

League table

  advanced to Semi-Finals

Play-Offs

Awards of the Series

BCL Season 3 Details
Host: VJ Benafsha Soonawalla and VJ Ayesha
Commentators: Shardul Pandit, RJ Urmin and RJ Sidhu

League table

  advanced to Semi-Finals

Play-Offs

Awards of the Series

BCL Season 4 Details
Host: VJ Benafsha Soonawalla
Dugout Buddies: Faizy Boo and Pratik Sehajpal
Commentators: Kunal Pandit and RJ Sidhu
4th Umpire: Rakhi Sawant

League table

  advanced to Semi-Finals

Matches

Play-Offs

Play-Offs Awards

Awards of the Series

Other Versions
Box Cricket League - Punjab (BCL Punjab)

 The BCL Punjab took place in 2015 with Punjab Television Actors. Most of Punjabi Actors from BCL were also a part of BCLP Teams.

Box Cricket League - Marathi (BCL Marathi)

 The BCL Marathi rolled three seasons in years 2014, 2015 and 2016. Players were from the Marathi Television Industry.

Box Cricket League - Kannada (BCL Sandalwood)

 The BCL Kannada known as BCL Sandalwood  rolled two seasons in years 2015 and 2016. Players were from the Kannada Television Industry.

Box Cricket League - Telugu (BCL Kollywood)

 The BCL Telugu known as BCL Kollywood  rolled out in the year 2017 with 8 teams with players from the Telugu Television Industry.

References

External links
Official Website

Cricket on television
Balaji Telefilms television series
Sony Entertainment Television original programming
Colors TV original programming
MTV (Indian TV channel) original programming
Indian sports television series
Indian reality television series
Hindi-language television shows
2014 Indian television series debuts
Indoor cricket
Celebrity competitions